Hausa-language cinema, known informally as Kannywood, is the Hausa-language film industry of Northern Nigeria. It is based in Kano.

Kannywood
Kannywood is the sobriquet for Hausa-language cinema. It is a part of the larger Nigerian cinema, known as Nollywood, which includes other production centres producing films in many other Nigerian languages.  The name "Kannywood" is a portmanteau derived from Kano and Hollywood, the center of the American film industry. "Kannywood" has origins in the late 1990s, when Sunusi Shehu of Tauraruwa Magazine created the term Kannywood and then it became the popular reference term for the industry in the Northern Nigeria. The term "Kannywood" was coined in 1999, three years before the term Nollywood came about.

History
The Hausa language cinema slowly evolved from the productions of RTV Kaduna and Radio Kaduna in the 1960s. Veterans like Dalhatu Bawa and Kasimu Yero pioneered drama productions that became popular with the Northern audience.

In the 70's and 80's, Usman Baba Pategi and Mamman Ladan introduced the Hausa Comedy to the Northern audience.

1990s: Bollywood influence 
The 1990s saw a dramatic change in the Hausa language cinema, eager to attract more Hausa audience who find Bollywood movies more attractive, Kannywood; a cinematic synthesis of Indian and Hausa culture evolved and became extremely popular. Turmin Danya ("The Draw"), 1990, is usually cited as the first commercially successful Kannywood film. It was quickly followed by others like Gimbiya Fatima In Da So Da Kauna, Munkar, Badakala and Kiyarda Da Ni. New actors like Ibrahim Mandawari and Hauwa Ali Dodo became popular and set the stage for the emergence of super-star like female actresses later on.

2000s Kannywood 
By 2012, over 2000 film companies were registered with the Kano State Filmmakers Association.

A local censoring committee created by Kanywood Producers and Marketers was converted into a board and named Kano State Censorship Board in 2001 by Governor Rabiu Kwankwaso. Mr. Dahiru Beli was appointed the first Executive Secretary of the board.

Music 
Songwriters and singers who produce or perform music in Hausa films include Nazifi Asnanic, Naziru M Ahmad, Ali Jita, and Fati Nijar.
Umar M Sharif ,

Critics

Islamic critics 
In 2003, with the rise of the Izala and the coming to power of Ibrahim Shekarau, the then ultra-religious government of  Kano initiated an iconoclastic campaign against Kannywood. Numerous movies deemed irreligious were censored and some film makers were jailed. This reversed some of the gains Kannywood had made and allowed the Southern Nigerian film industry to supersede it.

Problems with government 
In 2007, the Hiyana Affair: when the sex tape of a popular actress became public led to a severe backlash from the then Islamist government of Kano State under Ibrahim Shekarau. Shekarau went on to appoint a Director General for the censorship board, Abubakar Rabo Abdulkareem with the support of the Izala Society and other Islamist organisations, Kannywood and the equally popular Hausa romantic novel industry were severely censored, actors, actresses and writers were jailed by the state government and books and other media materials were burnt by the Governor himself. In 2011 the replacement of the Islamist government by a much more liberal government led by the PDP led to a more favourable atmosphere for the industry. In 2019, following the re-election of governor Abdullahi Umar Ganduje as governor of Kano State, a new spate of arrests of musicians and filmmakers was launched by the Censorship Board under its Executive Secretary, Isma'il Na'abba Afakallahu. A movie director, Sunusi Oscar, and a musician, Naziru M. Ahmad, were arrested and taken to court over accusations that they released songs without the permission of the censor. The duo were released on bail. The opposition Kwankwasiyya Movement stated that the arrests were politically motivated because the accused persons were considered as sympathizers of the Peoples Democratic Party in the last general election.

See also 

 Kannywood Actors

References

Cinema of Nigeria
Hausa-language culture